Candace Saari Kovacic-Fleischer is an American legal scholar who is a professor emerita at the Washington College of Law of American University. She has taught there since 1981 and specializes in: Sex-based Discrimination; Work, Family and Equality; and Contracts and Remedies.

Biography
Kovacic-Fleischer grew up in Kensington, Maryland and attended Walter Johnson High School. She studied at Wellesley College, where she received an A.B. in Economics in 1969, and at Northeastern University School of Law, graduating with a J.D. in 1974. After law school, she clerked first for Judge James L. Oakes of the United States Court of Appeals for the Second Circuit, and then Warren E. Burger, Chief Justice of the United States Supreme Court from 1975 to 1976. She was the first woman to clerk for the Chief Justice. Following her clerkships, she practiced law in Washington, D.C. as an associate of both Cole and Groner and Wilmer, Cutler, and Pickering.

In 1981, she joined the faculty of Washington College of Law at American University, and in 1986 was named a full professor. In 1988, she was a Visiting Professor at the University of California, Los Angeles Law School. In 2016, she wrote a letter to the editor pointing out the sexist elements in a blog post on President Donald Trump's economic advisors. In May 2017, she signed a letter concerning hate crimes on campus.

She is co-author of a popular case book, Equitable Remedies, Restitution and Damages, now in its eighth edition.

Since 2002, she has served as a member of the American Law Institute.

Personal life
She is married to Walter Hersch Fleischer, a Harvard Law School-educated lawyer specializing in appeals, and they have a child named Ilona.

See also
 List of law clerks of the Supreme Court of the United States (Chief Justice)

References

Select publications

Books
  (5th ed., 1994; 6th ed., 2000; 7th ed., 2005).

Articles

External links
 Bio, Washington College of Law
 Author page, SSRN.com
 Appearances on C-SPAN.org

People from Bethesda, Maryland
Year of birth missing (living people)
1940s births
Living people
20th-century American lawyers
21st-century American lawyers
Wellesley College alumni
Northeastern University School of Law alumni
Law clerks of the Supreme Court of the United States
Washington College of Law faculty
American legal scholars
American women academics
Wilmer Cutler Pickering Hale and Dorr associates
Members of the American Law Institute
20th-century American women
21st-century American women